Venetian Honeymoon is a 1959 Italian-French romantic comedy film directed by Alberto Cavalcanti. It is loosely based on the Abel Hermant novel Les noces vénitiennes.

Plot

Cast 

Martine Carol as Isabelle
Vittorio De Sica as Alfredo
Philippe Nicaud as  Gérard Chevalier
Marthe Mercadier as Antoinette Sophronides
Jacques Sernas as  Roberto Lo Bello, aka "Bob Lebel"
Claudia Cardinale as 	Angelica
Giacomo Furia as   Stanislao
 Don Ziegler as   Aristide Sophronides, aka "Soso"
Martita Hunt as   Lisa Bradwell
 André Versini as   Marquis Rodrigo Gutierrez
Ave Ninchi as   Jolanda
 Brigitte Juslin as   Franca
 Ivan Dominique as   John

References

External links

Italian romantic comedy films
French romantic comedy films
1959 romantic comedy films
1959 films
Films based on French novels
Films with screenplays by Luciano Vincenzoni
1950s French films
1950s Italian films